Elections to Tynedale District Council were held for the final time on 3 May 2007.  The whole council was up for election and the Conservative Party kept overall control of the council. The council was abolished in 2009 when Northumberland County Council became a unitary authority.

Election Result

|}

Ward results

2007 English local elections
2007
21st century in Northumberland